This is a list of UNESCO World Heritage Sites in China. China has 56, ranking second in the world just below Italy (58). China ratified The Convention Concerning the Protection of the World Cultural and Natural Heritage on 12 December 1985. These sites comprise some of the most essential part of China's valuable and rich tourism resources.

Overview 
Since joining the International Convention Concerning the Protection of World Cultural and Natural Heritage in 1985, China has 56 World Heritage Sites to date; of these 38 are cultural heritage sites, 14 are natural heritage sites, and 4 are cultural and natural (mixed) sites, ranking second in the world.

In addition, there are also several Chinese documents inscribed in UNESCO's list Memory of the World, which registers the world's documentary heritage. Furthermore, China has a rich non-material cultural heritage, with several of them inscribed on UNESCO's list of Masterpieces of the Oral and Intangible Heritage of Humanity.

Map 
Following is a map of the World Heritage Sites in China.

Numbered sites around Beijing: 1. Great Wall; 2. Forbidden City; 3. Zhoukoudian; 4. Summer Palace; 5. Temple of Heaven; 6. Ming tombs; 7. Eastern Qing Tombs; 8. Western Qing Tombs

Legend:  Cultural Heritage site;  Natural Heritage site;  Mixed site

World Heritage Sites 
* = World Cultural Heritage Site
† = World Natural Heritage Site
*† = World Cultural and Natural Heritage Site (Mixed)

Tentative list 
There are the sites China has submitted to the UNESCO World Heritage tentative list.
 Dongzhai Port Nature Reserve (1996)
 The Alligator Sinensis Nature Reserve (1996)
 Poyang Nature Reserve (1996)
 The Lijiang River Scenic Zone at Guilin (1996)
 Yalong, Tibet (2001)
 Yangtze Gorges Scenic Spot (2001)
 Jinfushan Scenic Spot (2001)
 Heaven Pit and Ground Seam Scenic Spot (2001)
 Hua Shan Scenic Area (2001)
 Yandang Mountains (2001)
 Nanxi River (2001)
 Maijishan Scenic Spots (2001)
 Wudalianchi Scenic Spots (2001)
 Haitan Scenic Spots (2001)
 Dali Cangshan Mountain and Erhai Lake Scenic Spot (2001)
 Sites for Liquor Making in China (2008)
 Ancient Residences in Shanxi and Shaanxi Provinces (2008)
 City Walls of the Ming and Qing Dynasties (2008)
 Slender West Lake and Historic Urban Area in Yangzhou (2008)
 Ancient Water Towns South of the Yangtze River (Zhouzhuang, Luzhi, Wuzhen, and Xitang) (2008)
 Fenghuang Ancient City (2008)
 Sites of the Southern Yue State (2008)
 Baiheliang Ancient Hydrological Inscription (2008)
 Miao Nationality Villages in Southeast Guizhou Province: The villages of Miao Nationality at the Foot of Leigong Mountain in Miao Ling Mountains (2008)
 Karez Wells (2008)
 Expansion Project of Imperial Tombs of the Ming and Qing Dynasties: King Lujian’s Tombs (2008)
 The Four Sacred Mountains as an extension of Mt. Taishan (2008)
 Taklimakan Desert–Populus euphratica Forests (2010)
 China Altay (2010)
 Karakorum–Pamir (2010)
 The Central Axis of Beijing (including Beihai) (2013)
 Wooden Structures of Liao Dynasty – Wooden Pagoda of Yingxian County, Main Hall of Fengguo Monastery of Yixian County (2013)
 Sites of the Hongshan Culture: Niuheliang, Hongshanhou, and Weijiawopu (2013)
 Ancient Porcelain Kiln Site in China (2013)
 Sanfang Qixiang (2013)
 Ancient Tea Plantations of Jingmai Mountain in Pu'er (2013)
 Western Xia Imperial Tombs (2013)
 Dong Villages (2013)
 Lingqu Canal (2013)
 Diaolou Buildings and Villages for Tibetan and Qiang Ethnic Groups (2013)
 Archaeological Sites of the Ancient Shu State: Jinsha site and Joint Tombs of Boat-shaped Coffins in Chengdu, Sichuan; Sanxingdui site in Guanghan, 29th – 5th century BC (2013)
 Xinjiang Yardang (2015)
 Dunhuang Yardangs (2015)
 Tianzhushan (2015)
 Jinggangshan–North Wuyishan (extension of Mount Wuyi) (2015)
 Shudao (2015)
 Tulin–Guge Scenic and Historic Interest Areas (2015)
 (2016)
 The Chinese Section of the Silk Roads (2016)
 Guancen Mountain – Luya Mountain (2017)
 Hulun Buir Landscape and Birthplace of Ancient Minority (2017)
 Qinghai Lake (2017)
 Scenic and historic area of Sacred Mountains and Lakes (Gang Rinpoche, Naimona'nyi, Lake Manasarovar and Lhanag-tso) (2017)
 Taihang Mountain (2017)
 Vertical Vegetation Landscape and Volcanic Landscape in Changbai Mountain (2017)
Badain Jaran Desert—Towers of Sand and Lakes (2019)
Guizhou Triassic Fossil Sites (2019)
Huangguoshu Scenic Area (2019)

Performance of China in UNESCO

See also 
 List of UNESCO Biosphere Reserves in China
 Major Historical and Cultural Sites Protected at the National Level
 Cultural heritage of China
 Principles for the Conservation of Heritage Sites in China
 List of World Heritage Sites in Asia (see template below for more regions)
 Table of World Heritage Sites by country
 UNESCO World Heritage Site
 World Heritage Committee

References

External links 

Official centre website
Official sites website
Official UNESCO World Heritage Centre website

 
China
World Heritage Sites
Cultural heritage of China
Historic sites in China
Protected areas of China
World Heritage Sites